Tectonic family member 3 is a protein in humans that is encoded by the TCTN3 gene.

This gene encodes a member of the tectonic gene family which functions in Hedgehog signal transduction and development of the neural tube. Mutations in this gene have been associated with Oral-facial-digital syndrome IV and Joubert syndrome 18. Alternatively spliced transcript variants encoding multiple isoforms have been observed for this gene. [provided by RefSeq, Sep 2012].

References

Further reading 

Genes on human chromosome 10